Knocking on wood (also phrased touching wood) is an apotropaic tradition of literally touching, tapping, or knocking on wood, or merely stating that one is doing or intending to do so, in order to avoid "tempting fate" after making a favorable prediction or boast, or a declaration concerning one's own death or another unfavorable situation.

Origin
A common explanation traces the phenomenon to ancient Celtic peoples, who believed it called on spirits or gods of the trees, while Christians tie the practice to the wood of the cross of crucifixion. A more modern theory from folklore researcher Steve Roud suggests it derives from a form of tag called "Tiggy Touchwood" in which players are safe from being tagged if they are touching wood. The British version of the phrase "touch wood" has been traced back as far as the 17th century.

Similar traditions across the world 

 In Bosnia and Herzegovina, Croatia, Montenegro and Serbia there is also the habit of knocking on wood when saying something positive or affirmative about someone or something and not wanting that to change. Frequently the movement of knocking on nearby wood is followed by  /  ("I will knock on wood"), or sometimes by  /  ("I don't want to jinx it").
 In Brazil and Portugal,  ("knock on wood") is something actually done physically, three knocks are required after giving an example of a bad thing eventually happening. No verbalization is required, just the three knocks on the closest piece or object of wood. In the absence of wood, someone can say , to prevent the bad thing to happen. People do not actually believe knocking three times on a piece of wood will really protect them, but it is a social habit and it is polite to do so to demonstrate that one doesn't want that bad thing one is talking about to actually happen.
 In Bulgaria the superstition of "knock on wood" is reserved for protection against the evil, and is not typically used for attracting good luck. Usually people engage in the practice in reaction to bad news, actual or merely imagined. In most cases the nearest wooden object is used (in some areas, however, tables are exempt); if there are no such objects within immediate reach, a common tongue-in-cheek practice is to knock on one's head. Knocking on wood is often followed by lightly pulling one's earlobe with the same hand. Common phrases to accompany the ritual are "God guard us" and "may the Devil not hear".
In Denmark the saying is 7, 9, 13 /  (usually accompanied by knocking under a table), as these numbers have traditionally been associated with magic.
 In Egypt,   ("hold the wood") is said when mentioning either good luck one has had in the past or hopes one has for the future. When referring to past good luck the expression is usually used in hopes of the good thing continuing to occur via its spoken acknowledgment, as well as preventing envy. (Citation)
 In old English folklore, "knocking on wood" also referred to when people spoke of secrets – they went into the isolated woods to talk privately and "knocked" on the trees when they were talking to hide their communication from evil spirits who would be unable to hear when they knocked. Another version holds that the act of knocking was to perk up the spirits to make them work in the requester's favor. Yet another version holds that a sect of monks who wore large wooden crosses around their necks would tap or "knock" on them to ward away evil.
In Medieval England knights being sent into battle would visit the wooden effigy of a knight in Southwark Cathedral and touch its nose for luck. The Knight's Tale in The Canterbury Tales begins in Southwark for this reason. The effigy can still be seen in the cathedral to this day.
 In modern day England the expression "touch wood" is more commonly heard than "knock on wood".
Usually the person knocks three times. It is also done when one experiences a bad Omen.
 In Greece the saying   ("knock on wood") is said when hearing someone say something negative in order to prevent it from happening.
 In India, the 'touch wood' is used to promote continued good luck and/or prevent bad omens.
 In Iran,  when one says something good about something or somebody, he or she might knock on wood and say   ("[I] am knocking on wood to prevent he/she/it from being jinxed"). The evil eye and the concept of being jinxed are common phobias and superstitious beliefs in Iranian culture, and Iranians traditionally believe knocking on wood wards off evil spirits. (Citation)
In Israel the saying   ("without the evil eye") is said when someone mentions good things happening to himself or someone else, or even when mentioning a valuable things he owns. This expression is a superstition that is used in the hope that a good thing will continue to occur even after it is mentioned, and as a way to prevent envy (hasad ) also known as the Evil Eye, as they believe that Envy can harm other people.
 In Italy,  ("touch iron") is used, especially after seeing an undertaker or something related to death.
 In Latin America, it is also tradition to physically knock a wooden object. A variant requires that the object does not have feet, which rules out chairs, tables and beds.
 In Lebanon and Syria the saying   ("knock on [the] wood") is said when hearing someone say something negative in order to prevent it from happening. It is also largely observed when saying something positive or affirmative about someone or something and not wanting that to change.
 In North Macedonia, "knocking on wood" is a folk belief and people usually do that after someone says something bad to make sure nothing bad happens.
In the Czech Republic, this is often accompanied for stronger effect by knocking on one's teeth, a piece of building stone, or metal, reasoning that these (as opposed to wood) survive even fire.
 In Romania, there is also a superstition that one can avoid bad things aforementioned by literally knocking on wood. Wood tables are exempted. One of the possible reasons could be that there is a monastery practice to call people to pray by playing / knocking the simantron.
 In Spain  and in France  ("to touch wood") is something that you say when you want your luck or a good situation to continue, e.g.  ("It's been good all week and, touching wood, the weekend will stay good").
 In Sweden, a common expression is "pepper, pepper, touch wood", referring to throwing pepper over one's shoulder and touching a wooden object.
 In Turkey, when someone hears about a bad experience someone else had, he/she may gently pull one earlobe, and knock on a wood twice, which means "God save me from that thing".
 In the United States in the eighteenth century, men used to knock on the wood stock of their muzzle-loading rifles to settle the black powder charge, ensuring the weapon would fire cleanly.
 In Vietnam a common expression is "trộm vía". It is said when a speaker wants the good/positive aforementioned thing will continue, especially when saying some good things about a newborn because they believe if they did not say the words, negative things would happen later.
 In Assam in Northeast India as well as in Russia, the expression "thu thu thu" -- the onomatopoeic phrase to represent the sound of spitting -- is used after making a favourable prediction or commenting on an ongoing favourable occurrence in order to deter misfortune befalling these favourable circumstances. Its use is similar to the use of the phrase "touchwood" in Western traditions.
 In Russia and Ukraine, "" ("To knock on wood") has the same meaning. There is also an expression "" ("Tfu Tfu Tfu") phrase to represent the sound of spitting similar with Assam in Northeast India. The difference, however, is that the person would have to "spit" with his head turned to the left shoulder which represents "spitting away" bad fortune because it is situated on the left (unstable) side of life"
 In South Korea, when you take back what you said, you say, "Grab the wood and do 'tweetweetwee-The sound of spitting-'". This means that in connection with the saying, "Be careful with your words" if you don't want anything bad to happen.

References

See also 

 Alomancy, related to throwing salt over the left shoulder
 Crossed fingers
 Evil eye
 Jinx

Superstitions
Trees in culture